Tresidder Peak is a mountain in Yosemite National Park, California. The mountain has two summits (peaks or arêtes), about half a mile (800 meters) apart, with the southern peak being the highest.

It is the line parent of Clouds Rest, and is named for Donald Tresidder, a former president of Stanford University who had a longtime association with Yosemite National Park.

Cathedral Lakes are near.

References

External links
 
 Tresidder Peak at peakvisor.com

Mountains of Yosemite National Park
Mountains of Mariposa County, California
Mountains of Northern California